Canavalia pubescens, commonly known as Āwikiwiki or Lavafield Jack-bean, is a species of flowering plant in the legume family, Fabaceae, that is endemic to Hawaii.

Its natural habitats are dry forests and low shrublands. It is threatened by habitat destruction, mainly due to introduced grazing mammals. The US Fish and Wildlife Service recently proposed to list this plant as an endangered species.

References

External links

pubescens
Endemic flora of Hawaii
Taxa named by William Jackson Hooker
Taxonomy articles created by Polbot